The Mexico U-17 women's national football team is the national women's under-17 football team of Mexico and is managed by the Mexican Football Federation. Ana Galindo was named head coach on January 19, 2021, the same day Maribel Dominguez was promoted to the U20 squad.

Under Mónica Vergara, now the senior team's head coach, the team reached the final at the 2018 FIFA U-17 Women's World Cup in Uruguay. Although they fell 2–1 to Spain, their silver medal is the best showing for any Mexico squad at a FIFA Women's World Cup. The team also won the 2013 CONCACAF Women's U-17 Championship and were the runners up in the latest edition, which took place in 2018.

Most members of the current squad play in the Liga MX Femenil per the league's 1000-minute requirement for young players.

Results and fixtures

Legend

2021

2022

Players

Current squad
The following 21 players were named to the squad for the 2022 FIFA U-17 Women's World Cup.

Honours
CONCACAF Championship
Gold Medal  2013
Silver Medal  2010, 2016, 2018, 2022
Bronze Medal  2012

FIFA World Cup
Silver Medal  2018

Competitive record

FIFA U-17 Women's World Cup

*Draws include knockout matches decided on penalty kicks.

CONCACAF Women's U-17 Championship

References

External links

Women's national under-17 association football teams
Football